Chlorida obliqua is a species of beetle in the family Cerambycidae. It was described by Jean Baptiste Lucien Buquet in 1852.

References

Bothriospilini
Beetles described in 1852
Beetles of South America